The 129th Pennsylvania House of Representatives District is located in Southeastern Pennsylvania and has been represented since 2023 by Johanny Cepeda-Freytiz.

District profile
The 129th Pennsylvania House of Representatives District is located within Berks County. It includes Penn State Berks. It is made up of the following areas

Berks County
 City of Reading, (PART, Wards 06, 14 [PART, Divisions 01, 04 and 05],15 and 19)
 Wyomissing
 West Reading
 Sinking Spring
 Spring Township ((PART ,Districts 01, 02, 03, 04, 06, 09, 10 and 13))

Representatives

Recent election results

References

External links
District map from the United States Census Bureau
Pennsylvania House Legislative District Maps from the Pennsylvania Redistricting Commission.  
Population Data for District 129 from the Pennsylvania Redistricting Commission.

Government of Berks County, Pennsylvania
Government of Lancaster County, Pennsylvania
129